Vladan Matijević (Serbian-Cyrillic: Владан Матијевић; born 16 November 1962 in Čačak, SFR Yugoslavia) is a Serbian  writer and poet.

Life and Work
Vladan Matijević worked for eighteen years as an engineer in a chemical base factory after completing his university education. Since 2005, he has been working as directing editor of the publications of the Nadežda Petrović Gallery in his native town, where he still lives in a suburb today. He said in an interview with the Austrian newspaper Der Standard about himself that he tries to write as little as possible. Nevertheless, he has already created a considerable and well-respected literary work, which has been discussed in more than fifty reviews and essays of Serbian literary journals. Many of his much sold novels have been published for several times in Serbia, his internationally most successful novel Moments of Joy has been published in French (four editions in 2007, 2008 and 2009), Spanish (2008), German (2009), Italian (2014), Russian and Macedonian (2015) translation. In 2009, he took part in the event New Literature from Serbia by the Austrian literary society Podium and read from the original Serbian version of his novel Moments of Joy on the small stage of the Viennese coffee house Prückel. The sequence presented by him was subsequently read by an actress in German translation. In 2011, a collection of four short stories has been published as a multilingual edition in Albanian, Hungarian, Bulgarian and Romanian. In the same year, he was an invited participant of the Salon international du livre de Québec, the Leipzig Book Fair and the multinational event of the so-called cultural program Literature in Flux, organized by the HALMA Network in collaboration with the International Canetti Society. There were  readings on board of various ships in the harbors of some European cities along the Danube, he read in Ruse, Cetate, Belgrade, Novi Sad and Budapest. The artist was a Serbian representative at the European Literature Nights 2013 in Paris. In 2014, an English edition of his novel Very Little Light has been published by Geopoetika publishing in Belgrade. Matijević is multiple laureate of some major literary awards of Serbia and he is considered one of the most important contemporary authors in his country. In 2016, the writer Aleksandar Gatalica had a half-hour conversation with him in a broadcast of the program series Literary Dialogue (Književni dijalog), which has been recorded for RTS. He was participant of the Beijing International Book Fair 2017. In June 2018, he was invited by the Andrić Institute to Andrićgrad, where he talked about his work in a public discussion and answered questions from the audience.

In an interview with Gloria magazine, the writer was supposed to answer each letter associatively with an aphorism. Here are some samples that give his profound seriousness or fine sense of humor in a concise manner:
„B like Belgrade: A city where I have experienced many delightful moments.“
„E like European Union: We have been taking big steps for decades, and we have not come closer for a millimeter. Maybe it is a Serbian Fata Morgana.“
„G like Gandhi: prevailed without violence against the Empire and liberated the country. A fact that sounds like a myth.“
„H like Harem: after the liberation from the Ottoman Turks, some of our Vojvodes tried to preserve this wonderful oriental institution but were destroyed by European influence and premature Serbian emancipation.“
„P like Process: the best prose work of the Twentieth century.“
„V like Vatre: the first masterpiece of Marguerite Yourcenar. She wrote it to overcome her unhappy love.“

Finally, the author of many profound stories about people and our time shall be cited again:

„Since the second half of the 20th century, there are graduate marketing professionals in all areas of life. Advertising has become the greatest need of each person, it does not know any toothpaste to use, nor any food to eat, nor in what bed it wants to sleep until it is explained to the person by an advertising expert. I notice that today it is especially important that  is something inexpensive. And that's why everything became cheap. Such are our lives as well. Soon they will also go on sale. With the emergence of the internet, the phenomenon of advertising has reached its peak.“

Bibliography (selection)
Ne remeteći rasulo (Don't Disturb the Chaos), poetry, Dom omladine, Zaječar 1991.
Van kontrole (Out of Control), novel, Dečje novine, Gornji Milanovac 1995.
R. C. neminovno (R. C. Unavoidably), novel, Rad, Belgrade 1997, .
Samosvođenje (Self-reduction), poetry, Multigraf, Čačak 1999.
Prilično mrtvi (Pretty Dead), short stories, Narodna knjiga–Alfa, Belgrade 2000.
Pisac izdaleka (Writer from Afar), novel, Narodna knjiga–Alfa, Belgrade 2003, .
Časovi radosti (Moments of Joy), novel, Narodna knjiga–Alfa, Belgrade 2006, .
Žilavi komadi (Tough Plays), dramas, Gradac K, Čačak 2009, .
Vrlo malo svetlosti (Very Little Light), novel, Agora, Zrenjanin 2010, .
Memoari, amnezije : eseji, besede, beleške (Memoirs, Amnesias: Essays, Words, Notes), Službeni glasnik, Belgrade 2012, .
Pristaništa (Ports), short stories, Agora, Zrenjanin 2014, .
Susret pod neobičnim okolnostima (Meeting Under Unusual Circumstances), novel, Laguna, Belgrade 2016, .
Sloboda govora (Freedom Of Speech), novel, Laguna, Belgrade 2020, .
English editions
Very Little Light, Geopoetika Publishing, Belgrade 2014, .
The Quite Dead, Kontrast, Belgrade 2020, .
French editions
Les aventures de Minette Accentiévitch (Moments of Joy), Les Allusifs, Montreal 2007 and 2009, .
Les aventures de Minette Accentiévitch, Éditions Points, Paris 2008 and 2009, .
Le baisespoir du jeune Arnold (Out of Control), Les Allusifs, Montreal 2009, . 
Un rien de lumière (Very Little Light), Les Éditions Noir Sur Blanc, Paris and Lausanne 2019, .

Awards
 Milutin Uskoković Award 1999 for the short story Proleće Filipa Kukavice
 Andrić Award 2000 for Prilično mrtvi.
 NIN Award 2003 for Pisac izdaleka.
 Awards Zlatni Hit liber (Golden Hit liber) and Zlatni bestseler (Golden bestseller) 2004 for Pisac izdaleka
 Meša Selimović Award 2010 for Vrlo malo svetlosti
 Borisav Stanković Award 2010 for Vrlo malo svetlosti
 Isidora Sekulić Award 2010 for Vrlo malo svetlosti
 Awards Kočićevo pero and Kočićeva knjiga 2012 for Memoari, amnezije : eseji, besede, beleške
 Stevan Sremac Award and Danko Popović Award 2014 for Pristaništa
 Ramonda Serbika Award 2019 of Književna kolonija „Sićevo“for his entire contribution to Serbian literature

References

1962 births
Living people
Writers from Čačak
Serbian novelists
Serbian male poets
Serbian male short story writers
Serbian dramatists and playwrights